The final of the 1992 ICC Cricket World Cup was played at the Melbourne Cricket Ground, Melbourne on 25 March 1992. The match was won by Pakistan, under the captaincy of Imran Khan, as they defeated England by 22 runs to lift their first ever World Cup trophy. This was the second Cricket World Cup final to be played outside England and the first in Australia. 87,182 spectators turned out to see the final.

Details
England and Pakistan played each other in the Round Robin stage and Pakistan were dismissed for 74 runs. However, the match could not be completed and yielded no results.
In the final, winning the toss, Pakistan elected to bat with Ijaz Ahmed coming in as the only change from their semi final against New Zealand, while England too had one change with Derek Pringle replacing Gladstone Small. Pakistan openers Rameez Raja and Aamer Sohail struggled against Pringle and Chris Lewis, as both were dismissed cheaply. Imran Khan promoted himself and played the sheet anchor role along with Javed Miandad, pushing the scorecard. Imran was lucky to get a reprieve as Graham Gooch dropped a difficult chance. Derek Pringle bowled 4 no balls and 1 wide in his first spell, that read 8-2-13-2. Imran Khan and Javed Miandad struggled to score free runs and Pakistan touched the 100 mark only in the 31st over. Finally England broke the 139 partnership as Javed Miandad was dismissed by Richard Illingworth for 58. Soon Imran Khan was dismissed by Ian Botham for 72, as Wasim Akram joined Inzamam-ul-Haq. The pair added 52 runs from 38 balls as Pakistan scored 124 runs from their final 15 overs as the total score read 249/6 in the stipulated 50 overs, a gettable total for England's much fancied batting side. Derek Pringle had a dream spell of 10-2-22-3, but gave away 8 extra runs in the form of 5 no balls and 3 wides, while Richard Illingworth and Ian Botham claimed one wicket each, it became the 16th victim of the latter.

Chasing the target of 250 to win their maiden world cup, favourites England lost all rounder Ian Botham for no score to Wasim Akram. Alec Stewart soon fell to Aaquib Javed reeling England at 21/2. In form batsman Greame Hick and Graham Gooch slowly pushed the score, but Hick was dismissed by a beauty from Mushtaq Ahmed, a Googly that Hick failed to read. Soon Gooch fell to Mushtaq and England were in deep trouble with scorecard reading 69/4. Neil Fairbrother and Allan Lamb tried a rescue act with a partnership of 72 runs as asking rate began to pile up. Coming back for the second spell, Wasim Akram broke England's resistance by dismissing Allan Lamb and Chris Lewis with successive deliveries reeling English at 141/6. Neil Fairbrother and Dermot Reeve could not score big, as part-time bowler Aamir Sohail completed his quota of 10 overs as England failed to utilize Sohail's spell. With the final 10 overs to go, England needed 84 runs from 54 balls with an asking rate of 9.33 per over. Soon Fairbrother was dismissed for 62 scored off 70 balls by Aaquib sealing the fate of England. As 34 runs required from final 12 balls, it was a tough task for them as Imran Khan dismissed Richard Illingworth, that turned out to be his last ball in International cricket. For Pakistan, Aaquib Javed and Mushtaq Ahmed claimed 2 and 3 wickets respectively. Wasim Akram was adjudged the Man of the match for his all round performance of 3/49 and 33 off 18.

Complete Scorecard

Fall of wickets: 1-20 (Aamer Sohail, 4.6 ov), 2-24 (Ramiz Raja, 8.2 ov), 3-163 (Javed Miandad, 39.3 ov), 4-197 (Imran Khan, 43.3 ov), 5-249 (Inzamam-ul-Haq, 49.5 ov), 6-249 (Wasim Akram, 49.6 ov)

Fall of wickets: 1-6 (Ian Botham, 2.5 ov), 2-21 (Alec Stewart, 7.3 ov), 3-59 (Graeme Hick, 18.6 ov), 4-69 (Graham Gooch, 20.5 ov), 5-141 (Allan Lamb, 34.5 ov), 6-141 (Chris Lewis, 34.6 ov), 7-180 (Neil Fairbrother, 42.5 ov), 8-183 (Dermot Reeve, 43.6 ov), 9-208 (Phil DeFreitas, 47.1 ov), 10-227 (Richard Illingworth, 49.2 ov)

See also

1992 Cricket World Cup squads

References 

  ICC. Retrieved 2019-04-08

External links
Cricket World Cup 1992 from Cricinfo
1992 Cricket World Cup

3
Cricket World Cup Finals
1990s in Melbourne
Cricket in Melbourne